Cheliferoides segmentatus is a species of jumping spider in the family Salticidae. It is found in a range from the United States to Guatemala.

References

Further reading

 

Salticidae
Articles created by Qbugbot
Spiders described in 1901